The women's triple jump at the 2008 Olympic Games took place on August 15 and 17 at the Beijing Olympic Stadium.

Summary

The automatic qualifier was still 14.45m but unlike four years earlier with 15 auto qualifiers, only eight made it this time.  Hrysopiyi Devetzi was the #2 qualifier this time with a less spectacular 14.92m (40 cm less than her personal best in qualifying in 2004).  The fifth best jumper in history Yamilé Aldama was unable to find the take off board and fouled out in qualifying.

In the first round of the final, defending champion Françoise Mbango Etone showed she was serious jumping 15.19m to take the lead. Marija Šestak went 15.03m to move into second and the #2 jumper in history Tatyana Lebedeva jumped 15.00m for third place. After losing a notch in the all-time list, Lebedeva's third round 15.32m, only equalling her personal third best jump, moved her within 7 cm of the lead. Other athletes were able to improve over the 15m mark but the podium was set. Etone's gold was her nation's second individual gold medal in its Olympic history, which followed her first four years earlier.

Almost eight years after the event, blood samples were retested from the 2007 World Championships. Hrysopiyi Devetzi was found to have stanozolol in her sample and her results were annulled. A year after the event, Devetzi was credited with failing another drug test for failing to allow a different test. She retired in 2009. Her 2004 silver medal was not affected by the annulment. In 2017, retests showed Lebedeva also had a positive test for turinabol and was also disqualified from both her medals at the 2008 Olympics. The IOC requested that the IAAF modify the results, and, after CAS dismissed the appeal of Tatyana Lebedeva, the medals were redistributed accordingly. Olga Rypakova was advanced to silver, and Yargelis Savigne was advanced to bronze.

Records
Prior to this competition, the existing world and Olympic records were as follows.

The following new Olympic record was set during this competition.

Results

Qualifying round
Qualifying Performance 14.45 (Q) or at least 12 best performers (q) advance to the Final.

Final
The final was held on August 17.

References

Triple women
Triple jump at the Olympics
2008 in women's athletics
Women's events at the 2008 Summer Olympics